Vladimir Borisovich Gabulov (Gabulte Boriše fert Vlâdimir, born 19 October 1983) is a former Russian footballer who played as a goalkeeper. He was part of Russia's Euro 2008, 2017 FIFA Confederations Cup and 2018 FIFA World Cup squads as the third choice goalkeeper.

Career
On 2 January 2018, he signed a 1.5-year contract with the Belgian side Club Brugge.

He officially retired as a player on 12 November 2018.

International career
Gabulov made his debut for Russia on 22 August 2007 in a friendly against Poland before being substituted by Anton Shunin at half-time. He made his competitive debut in a Euro 2008 qualifier against Macedonia and was sent off in the 69th minute fouling against Goran Maznov. On 17 October 2007, he was chosen to play in a vital must win match against England because Igor Akinfeev was injured and Vyacheslav Malafeev was in poor form. He made several key saves as Russia made a comeback from a goal down to defeat England 2–1. For his performance against England, Gabulov started in Russia's remaining two qualifiers against Israel and Andorra before being chosen as the third choice goalkeeper behind Akinfeev and Malafeev for Russia's Euro 2008 squad.

On 11 May 2018, he was included in Russia's extended 2018 FIFA World Cup squad under the call of fellow Ossetian and coach Stanislav Cherchesov. On 3 June 2018, he was included in the finalized World Cup squad. He remained on the bench in all the games behind Igor Akinfeev.

Appearances in major competitions

Post-playing career
In the first year after his retirement, from 2018 to 2019, he served as the Minister of Sport in the government of North Ossetia–Alania. In the second half of 2019, he served as the president of Alania Vladikavkaz.

On 18 February 2020, he was appointed chairman of Russian Professional Football League club FC Olimp Khimki. On 28 December 2021, he was hired as a general director of the Russian Premier League club FC Khimki. He left Khimki on 5 May 2022.

Career statistics

Club

International
Statistics accurate as of match played 25 March 2013

Honours

Club
CSKA Moscow
UEFA Cup: 2004–05
Russian Premier League: 2005, 2006

Country
UEFA European Football Championship bronze medalist: 2008

Individual
Gentleman of the Year: 2009

Personal life
His younger brother Georgi Gabulov also plays football professionally.

References

1983 births
Living people
People from Mozdoksky District
Russian footballers
Ossetian people
Ossetian footballers
FC Kuban Krasnodar players
FC Amkar Perm players
PFC CSKA Moscow players
FC Dynamo Moscow players
FC Spartak Vladikavkaz players
FC Anzhi Makhachkala players
FC Arsenal Tula players
Club Brugge KV players
Association football goalkeepers
Russia under-21 international footballers
Russia international footballers
UEFA Euro 2008 players
2017 FIFA Confederations Cup players
Russian Premier League players
Belgian Pro League players
Russian expatriate footballers
Expatriate footballers in Belgium
Russian expatriate sportspeople in Belgium
2018 FIFA World Cup players
Sportspeople from North Ossetia–Alania